This is a list of énarques. Énarque is the name given to the alumni of the École nationale d'administration (National School of Public Administration) in France. The ENA was founded in 1945 and as the program is two years long, the first class graduated in 1947.

Politics

Heads of States and Governments 
 Valéry Giscard d'Estaing (class of 1951), President of the French Republic
 Édouard Balladur (class of 1957), French Prime Minister
 Michel Rocard (class of 1958), French Prime Minister
 Jacques Chirac (class of 1959), President of the French Republic
 Nicéphore Soglo (class of 1962), President of Benin
 André Ntsatouabantou Milongo (class of 1964), Prime Minister of the Republic of Congo
 Edem Kodjo (class of 1964), Prime Minister of Togo
 Lionel Jospin (class of 1965), Prime Minister of France
 Jean-Paul Proust (class of 1966), Minister of State of Monaco
 Patrick Leclercq (class of 1966), Minister of State of Monaco
 Paul Dijoud (class of 1966), Minister of State of Monaco
Alain Juppé (class of 1972), Prime Minister of France
Laurent Fabius (class of 1973), Prime Minister of France
Adly Mansour (class of 1977), President of Egypt
Dominique de Villepin (class of 1980), Prime Minister of France
François Hollande (class of 1980), President of the French Republic
Jean Castex (class of 1991), Prime Minister of France
Édouard Philippe (class of 1997), Prime Minister of France
Emmanuel Macron (class of 2004), President of the French Republic

International Organizations 
 François-Xavier Ortoli (class of 1947), President of the European Commission
 René Maheu (class of 1958), Director General of UNESCO
 Jacques de Larosière (class of 1958), managing director of the IMF, President of the European Bank for Reconstruction and Development
 Michel Camdessus (class of 1960), managing director of the IMF
 Jean-Paul Costa (class of 1966), President of the European Court of Human Rights
Jean-Claude Trichet (class of 1971), President of the European Central Bank
Pierre de Boissieu (class of 1971), Secretary-General of the Council of the European Union
Pascal Lamy (class of 1975), Director General of the World Trade Organization
Ronny Abraham (class of 1978), President of the International Court of Justice

Ministers and Secretaries of State 
 Alain Peyrefitte (class of 1947), French Minister of Justice
 Michel Poniatowski (class of 1948), French Minister of Interior
 Michel Jobert (class of 1948), French Minister of Foreign Affairs
 Claude Cheysson (class of 1948), French Minister of Foreign Affairs
 Jean-Pierre Fourcade (class of 1954), French Minister of Finance
 Nicole Questiaux (class of 1955), French Minister of Solidarity
 Jean François Poncet (class of 1955), French Minister of Foreign Affairs
 Jean-Bernard Raimond (class of 1956), French Minister of Foreign Affairs
 Philippe Malaud (class of 1956), French Minister of Information
 Bernard Stasi (class of 1959), French Minister of Overseas
 Pierre Joxe (class of 1962), French Minister of Interior
 Jean-Philippe Lecat (class of 1963), French Minister of Culture
 Jacques Toubon (class of 1965), French Minister of Justice
 Jean-Pierre Chevènement (class of 1965), French Minister of the Interior
 Hervé de Charette (class of 1966), French Minister of Foreign Affairs
 Catherine Tasca (class of 1967), French Minister of Culture
 Alain Lamassoure (class of 1968), French Minister of Budget
 Michel Audet (class of 1968), Minister of Finance of Québec
 Philippe Séguin (class of 1970), French Minister of Social Affairs
 Alain Richard (class of 1971), French Minister of Defence
 Claude Guéant (class of 1971), French Minister of Interior
 François d'Aubert (class of 1971), French Minister of Research
 Dominique Perben (class of 1972), French Minister of Justice
 François Léotard (class of 1973), French Minister of Culture
 Gérard Longuet (class of 1973), French Minister of Defence
 Hubert Védrine (class of 1974), French Minister of Foreign Affairs
 Anne-Marie Idrac (class of 1974), French Minister of Transports
 Élisabeth Guigou (class of 1974), French Minister of Justice
 Martine Aubry (class of 1975), French Minister of Employment
 Paul Masseron (class of 1976), Minister of the principality of Monaco
 Michel Sapin (class of 1980), French Minister of Finance
 Ségolène Royal (class of 1980), French Minister of Ecology
 Renaud Donnedieu de Vabres (class of 1980), French Minister of Culture
 François Goulard (class of 1981), French Minister of Research
 Ridha Grira (class of 1982), Tunisian Minister of Defence
 Catherine Colonna (class of 1983), French Minister of European Affairs
 Pierre Moscovici (class of 1984), French Minister of Finance
 Philippe Bas (class of 1984), French Minister of Health
 Renaud Dutreil (class of 1989), French Minister of Civil Service
 Jean-François Copé (class of 1989), French Minister of Budget
 Valérie Pécresse (class of 1992), French Minister of Higher Education
 Bruno Le Maire (class of 1998), French Minister of Agriculture
 Chantal Jouanno (class of 1999), French Minister of Sports
 Fleur Pellerin (class of 2000), French Minister of Culture
 Nicolas Kazadi (class of 2000), Minister of Finance and Ambassador-at-large for the Democratic Republic of Congo
 Laurent Wauquiez (class of 2001), French Minister of Higher Education
 Clément Beaune (class of 2009), French Secretary of State for European affairs

Other political figures 
 Yves Guéna (class of 1947), President of the Constitutional Council
 Pascal Arrighi (class of 1948), French MP
 Jean-François Deniau (class of 1952), French MP
 Michel Albert (class of 1956), Permanent Secretary of the Académie des Sciences Morales et Politiques
 Robert Miguet (class of 1958), prefect
 Jean-Pierre Soisson (class of 1961), French MP
 Yann Gaillard (class of 1961), French MP
 Renaud Denoix de Saint Marc (class of 1964), Vice President of the Conseil d'État
 Ernest-Antoine Seillière (class of 1965), President of the MEDEF
 Josselin de Rohan (class of 1965), French MP
 François Bujon de l'Estang (class of 1966), Ambassador of France to the United States
 Antoine Rufenacht (class of 1968), Mayor of Le Havre
 René Couanau (class of 1968), French MP
 Pierre Brochand (class of 1968), Director of the DGSE
 Jean-Claude Guibal (class of 1969), French MP
 Jacques Cheminade (class of 1969), French political activist
 Daniel Jouanneau (class of 1970), Ambassador of France to Mozambique, Swaziland, Lesotho, Lebanon, Canada and Pakistan
Pierre Steinmetz (class of 1970), member of the Constitutional Council of France
Jean-Paul Huchon (class of 1971), President of Île de France
Jean-Louis Bianco (class of 1971), French MP
Dominique Souchet (class of 1972), French MP
Christian Frémont (class of 1972), Chief of staff of Nicolas Sarkozy
Jean-Marc de La Sablière (class of 1973), Ambassador of France to Italy
Rachid Bladehane, Algerian politician
Yvan Blot (class of 1973), European MP
Didier Quentin (class of 1974), French MP
Philippe Marini (class of 1974), French MP
Henry de Lesquen (class of 1974), President of the Club de l'Horloge
Jean-Yves Le Gallou (class of 1974), European MP
Jean-Pierre Landau (class of 1974), Second Deputy Governor of the Banque de France
Michel Diefenbacher (class of 1974), French MP
Bernadette Malgorn (class of 1975), prefect
Olivier Dutheillet de Lamothe (class of 1975), member of the Constitutional Council of France
Bernard Bajolet (class of 1975), Director of the DGSE
Christian Noyer (class of 1976), Governor of the Banque de France
Régis Guyot (class of 1976), prefect
Jean-Marie Guéhenno (class of 1976), CEO of International Crisis Group
Gilles Carrez (class of 1976), French MP
Bernard Bonnet (class of 1976), prefect
Pierre Vimont (class of 1977), Ambassador of France to the United States of America
Jean-Marc Sauvé (class of 1977), Vice President of the Council of State
Jean-François Mancel (class of 1977), French MP
Philippe de Villiers (class of 1978), European MP
Bruno Racine (class of 1979), President of the Bibliothèque nationale de France
Charles de Courson (class of 1979), French MP
Jean-Louis Bourlanges (class of 1979), European MP
Jean-Maurice Ripert (class of 1980), Permanent Representative of France to the United Nations
Pierre-René Lemas (class of 1980), Chief of staff of François Hollande
Stanislas Lefebvre de Laboulaye (class of 1980), Ambassador Extraordinary and Plenipotentiary of the Republic of France to the Holy See
Jean-Pierre Jouyet (class of 1980), Chief of staff of François Hollande
Sylvie Hubac (class of 1980), Chief of staff of François Hollande
Claire Bazy-Malaurie (class of 1980), member of the Constitutional Council of France
Raymond-Max Aubert (class of 1980), French MP
Richard Samuel (class of 1981), prefect
Paul Giacobbi (class of 1982), French MP
Paul-Marie Coûteaux (class of 1982), European MP
Gérard Araud (class of 1982), Ambassador of France to the United States
Marc Le Fur (class of 1983), French MP
Bernard Émié (class of 1983), Ambassador of France to the United Kingdom
Yves Détraigne (class of 1983), French MP
Adolphe Colrat (class of 1983), prefect
Patrick Strzoda (class of 1983), Emmanuel Macron's chief of staff, prefect
François Villeroy de Galhau (class of 1984), Governor of the Banque de France
Abderezak Sebgag, Algerian Minister of Youth and Sports
Jean-Michel Severino (class of 1984), Director of the Agence Française de Développement
Jean Mallot (class of 1984), French MP
François Asselineau (class of 1985), General inspector of finances and founder of UPR
Xavier Musca (class of 1985), Chief of staff of Nicolas Sarkozy
Hervé Gaymard (class of 1986), French MP
Jean-Christophe Potton (class of 1987), Ambassador of France to Uruguay
Henri Plagnol (class of 1987), French MP
Christian Paul (class of 1987), French MP
Gaëtan Gorce (class of 1987), French MP
Philippe Galli (class of 1988), prefect
Sylvie Goulard (class of 1989), European MP
Nicolas Dupont-Aignan (class of 1989), French MP
Martin Hirsch (class of 1990), Head of Emmaüs France
Alain Seban (class of 1991), President of the Pompidou Center
Frédéric Salat-Baroux (class of 1991), Chief of staff of Jacques Chirac
Anne Paugam (class of 1993), Director of the Agence Française de Développement
Richard Didier (class of 1994), prefect
Emmanuelle Mignon (class of 1995), cabinet secretary for Nicolas Sarkozy
Jérôme Guedj (class of 1996), French MP
Olivier Ferrand (class of 1997), French MP
Guillaume Larrivé (class of 2002), French MP
Julien Anfruns (class of 2002), Member of the Council of State of France
Florian Philippot (class of 2009), European MP

Business 
 Michel Pébereau (class of 1967), CEO of BNP Paribas
 Jean Drucker (class of 1968), CEO of M6
 Hélie de Noailles (class of 1969), Director of Lazard
Louis Schweitzer (class of 1970), Chairman of Renault
Marc Ladreit de Lacharrière (class of 1970), CEO of FIMALAC
Michel Bon (class of 1971), CEO of Carrefour
Jean-Cyril Spinetta (class of 1972), CEO of Air-France KLM
Jean-Louis Gergorin (class of 1972), Executive Vice President of EADS
Louis Gallois (class of 1972), CEO of EADS
Jean-Paul Cluzel (class of 1972), CEO of Radio France
Alain Minc (class of 1975), business and political advisor
Serge Weinberg (class of 1976), Chairman of Weinberg Capital Partners
Yves-Thibault de Silguy (class of 1976), Executive Vice President of Vinci
Michel de Rosen (class of 1976), CEO of Eutelsat
Baudouin Prot (class of 1976), CEO of BNP Paribas
Jean-Charles Naouri (class of 1976), CEO of Casino
Gérard Mestrallet (class of 1978), CEO of GDF SUEZ
Paul Hermelin (class of 1978), CEO of Capgemini
Henri de Castries (class of 1980), CEO of AXA
Jean-Jacques Augier (class of 1980), CEO of Taxis G7
Philippe Crouzet (class of 1981), Chairman of Vallourec
Jean-Marie Messier (class of 1982), Chairman of Vivendi
Pierre-André de Chalendar (class of 1983), CEO of Saint Gobain
Walter Butler (class of 1983), Founder of Butler Capital Partners
Philippe Wahl (class of 1984), CEO of La Poste
Guillaume Pepy (class of 1984), CEO of SNCF
Philippe Capron (class of 1985), CFO of Veolia
Augustin de Romanet de Beaune (class of 1986), CEO of Aéroports de Paris
Stéphane Richard (class of 1987), CEO of Orange
Frédéric Oudéa (class of 1987), CEO of Société Générale
Bruno Deletré (class of 1987), CEO of Crédit Foncier de France
Nicolas Dufourcq (class of 1988), CEO of the Public Bank of Investment
Claire Dorland-Clauzel (class of 1988), Executive Vice President of Michelin
François Pérol (class of 1990), CEO of BPCE
Matthieu Pigasse (class of 1994), Deputy CEO of Lazard
Alexandre Bompard (class of 1999), CEO of Fnac

Academics 
 Gabriel de Broglie (class of 1960), historian
 Pierre-Jean Rémy (class of 1963), member of the Académie française
 Guy Sorman (class of 1969), writer
 Françoise Chandernagor (class of 1969), member of the Académie Goncourt
Jacques Attali (class of 1970), economist
José Frèches (class of 1978), novelist
Jean-Michel Gaillard (class of 1979), writer
François Sureau (class of 1981), writer
Andreas Kaplan (class of 2007), professor
Patrick Levaye (class of 1985), writer
Marc Lambron (class of 1985), writer
Richard Descoings (class of 1985), Director of Sciences Po
Guillaume Dustan (class of 1991), writer
Agnès Clancier (class of 1995), writer

Other
Jacques Frémontier (born surname Friedman; 1930–2020), French journalist and television producer
Emmanuel Glaser (class of 1992), French Lawyer

See also 
 École nationale d'administration
 Grandes écoles
 Education in France
 France

References

Ecole Nationale d'Administration